Hotel Fürstenhof was a luxury hotel facing both Leipziger Platz and Potsdamer Platz in Berlin, Germany. It was designed by architects Richard Bielenberg and Josef Moser and opened in 1907. On 22 November 1943 the hotel was destroyed during an air raid on Berlin in World War II; the ruins were completely demolished in the 1950s.

Originally, the hotel was built in the Neoclassical style in the second half of the 19th century. After its renovation, enlargement and reopening in 1907, the architecture of the hotel had elements of Art Nouveau, the onset of Modernism and the Neo-Baroque. The interior of the building was elaborately decorated, including a fountain by Ludwig Mayer and carvings by Richard Kuhn.

Gallery

Furstenhof
Furstenhof
Furstenhof
Furstenhof
Furstenhof
Demolished buildings and structures in Berlin
Buildings and structures in Berlin destroyed during World War II
Art Nouveau architecture in Berlin
Furstenhof
1907 establishments in Germany
Demolished hotels